Nikola Rebić (born 22 January 1995) is a Serbian professional basketball player for Nizhny Novgorod of the VTB United League.

Professional career
Nikola grew up with Crvena zvezda youth team and signed his first professional contract with the club in February 2013. He stayed in the team until the end of 2015–16 season.

He signed a contract for the 2016–17 season with the Serbian team Mega Basket. He stayed with them for one and a half season. In February 2018, he signed a contract with the Spanish team Bilbao Basket until the end of season.

In September 2018, he signed a contract with the Montenegrin club Mornar Bar.

On 11 September 2019 he signed with BC Enisey of the VTB United League.

On 26 October 2020 he signed with Monaco of the LNB Pro A.

On 24 December 2020 he signed with Nanterre 92 of the LNB Pro A.

On 4 July 2021 he signed with Mitteldeutscher BC of the German Basketball Bundesliga.

On 15 November 2022 he signed with Nizhny Novgorod of the VTB United League.

References

External links
 Nikola Rebić at aba-liga.com
 Nikola Rebić at draftexpress.com
 Nikola Rebić at eurobasket.com
 Nikola Rebić at euroleague.net
 Nikola Rebic at fiba.com

1995 births
Living people
ABA League players
Basketball players from Belgrade
AS Monaco Basket players
Basketball League of Serbia players
BC Enisey players
BC Nizhny Novgorod players
Bilbao Basket players
KK Crvena zvezda players
KK Mega Basket players
KK Mornar Bar players
KK Radnički FMP players
Liga ACB players
Mitteldeutscher BC players
Nanterre 92 players
Point guards
Serbian expatriate basketball people in Montenegro
Serbian expatriate basketball people in Spain
Serbian men's basketball players